Litvin is a Slavic word for residents of Lithuania, which was used no earlier than the 16th century mostly by the East Slavs. Currently, Litvin or its cognates are used in a number of European languages for Lithuanians.

Meanings

Grand Duchy of Lithuania
In the 16–18th centuries, the term "Litvin" was mostly used by East Slavs to refer to all inhabitants of Lithuania, i.e. Grand Duchy of Lithuania.

Several authentic sources, surviving from the Middle Ages, with expressed opinion of the Grand Dukes of Lithuania themselves proves that the Lithuanians (founders, rulers of Lithuania from the Gediminids dynasty) were those who spoke Old Lithuanian and originated from the cultural regions of Aukštaitija and Žemaitija, while their Eastern neighbours were Rus' people (Ruthenians):

Ethnic group in Ukraine
Litvins are a small ethnic group in the area of the mid-stream Desna River (northern Ukraine). The ethnographic or cultural studies about Litvins are poorly noted and are traced to the beginning of the 18th century. The poet-monk  who published several cultural studies noted that Litvins, perhaps after an older pagan tradition, worked on Sundays and rested on Fridays. According to Markovych, Litvins are a regional group such as Gascons in France or Swabians in Germany.

The name Litvin (Litvyak) owes its origin to political factors and is a demonym (politonym) referencing the Grand Duchy of Lithuania. Litvins in the Chernihiv region (Chernihiv Oblast) call themselves Ruski, but not Moskals or Katsaps. They consider the term Litvin to be derogatory. According to the 2001 census, there were 22 Litvins in Ukraine.

Modern usage in Belarus

Since the dissolution of the Soviet Union in 1991, the term "Litvin" has been adopted by some Belarusian nationalists to claim the Grand Duchy of Lithuania as Belarusian. This is an alternative to the demonym "Belarusians" which is derived from White Rus' and, therefore, implies that it is somehow less than the Great Russia. Belarusians like Mikola Yermalovich and Viktor Veras claim that the Grand Duchy was Belarusian and that modern Lithuanians are historical Samogitians (the term Samogitia translates as Lowlands of Lithuania proper) who, despite being "not Lithuanians", somehow managed to usurp the name "Lithuania" for themselves. In other words, these writers in contrast to Lithuanian linguists claim that modern Belarusians are the true Lithuanians referred to in historical texts and not modern Lithuanians. This theory is considered fringe and is not accepted by historians. During the 2009 census, 66 people identified themselves as Litvins in Belarus.

Adam Mickiewicz is considered by some Belarusians to be "Litvin", but is more often considered to be a Lithuanian.

Modern usage in Poland

The Poles still use the words Litwini and Litwa when referring to the Lithuanians and Lithuania respectively. While the Belarusians and Belarus are named as Białorusini and Białoruś respectively in Polish.

Modern usage in Ukraine
The Grand Duchy of Lithuania is called  (Velyke kniazivstvo Lytovske).

See also

 Prussian Lithuanians
 Samogitians
 Polish-Lithuanian identity
 Litvaks or Lithuanian Jews
 Tutejszy
 Belarusian nationalism

References

External links
 Litvin, I. "Our "Lost world". Selected pages of Belarusian history ("Наш "Затерянный мир". Некоторые страницы белорусской истории"). 
 "Litvin" Belarusian folksong (Літвін Белорусская народная песня).

Baltic peoples
Demographic history of Lithuania
Ethnic groups in Ukraine
Slavic ethnic groups
Social history of Belarus
Social history of Ukraine